Wartovo Puara Jr (born 24 June 1990) is a Papua New Guinean professional rugby league footballer who plays as a  for the Sepik Pride Rugby League Football Club in the PNGNRL. He previously played for the Barrow Raiders in the Betfred Championship. He has represented the Papua New Guinean national team, most notably at the 2017 World Cup.

Early life 
Puara was born in Kokopo, Papua New Guinea, and played his junior rugby league for the Kokopo Muruks.

Playing career 
Puara joined the PNG Hunters in 2014 for their inaugural season in the Queensland Cup. He trained with the South Sydney Rabbitohs on a six week trial contract during the 2015 pre-season.

In 2019 Puara signed for the Barrow Raiders he enjoyed a great first season and was tipped by Barrie McDermott as one of 6 potential championship players that could play in super league. His form earned him a place in the PNG international side that took on Great Britain and won. In 2020 Puara signed a 2 year contract extension with the Raiders.

 Puara represented PNG in rugby league nines at the 2015 Pacific Games, scoring 2 tries in the grand final and being named Player of the Tournament.

References

External links
2017 RLWC profile

1990 births
Living people
Barrow Raiders players
People from East New Britain Province
Papua New Guinean rugby league players
Papua New Guinea Hunters players
Papua New Guinea national rugby league team players
Rugby league hookers